Poly(vinyl alcohol) (PVOH, PVA, or PVAl) is a water-soluble synthetic polymer. It has the idealized formula [CH2CH(OH)]n. It is used in papermaking, textile warp sizing, as a thickener and emulsion stabilizer in polyvinyl acetate (PVAc) adhesive formulations, in a variety of coatings, and 3D printing. It is colourless (white) and odorless. It is commonly supplied as beads or as solutions in water. Without an externally added crosslinking agent, PVA solution can be gelled through repeated freezing-thawing, yielding highly strong, ultrapure, biocompatible hydrogels which have been used for a variety of applications such as vascular stents, cartilages, contact lenses, etc.

Uses
PVA is used in a variety of medical applications because of its biocompatibility, low tendency for protein adhesion, and low toxicity. Specific uses include cartilage replacements, contact lenses, and eye drops. Polyvinyl alcohol is used as an aid in suspension polymerizations. Its largest application in China is its use as a protective colloid to make PVAc dispersions. In Japan its major use is the production of Vinylon fiber. This fiber is also manufactured in North Korea for self-sufficiency reasons, because no oil is required to produce it. Another application is photographic film.

PVA-based polymers are used widely in additive manufacturing. For example, 3D printed oral dosage forms demonstrate great potential in the pharmaceutical industry. It is possible to create drug-loaded tablets with modified drug-release characteristics where PVA is used as a binder substance.

Medically, it may also used as the embolic agent in a Uterine Fibroid Embolectomy (UFE).

PVA is commonly used in household sponges that absorb more water than Polyurethane sponges.  PVA glue is commonly used for glueing porous materials like wood, paper and cloth.

Polyvinyl acetals 
Polyvinyl acetals are prepared by treating PVA with aldehydes. Butyraldehyde and formaldehyde afford polyvinyl butyral (PVB) and polyvinyl formal (PVF), respectively. Preparation of polyvinyl butyral is the largest use for polyvinyl alcohol in the US and Western Europe.

Preparation
Unlike most vinyl polymers, PVA is not prepared by polymerization of the corresponding monomer, since the monomer, vinyl alcohol, is thermodynamically unstable with respect to its tautomerization to acetaldehyde. Instead, PVA is prepared by hydrolysis of polyvinyl acetate, or sometimes other vinyl ester-derived polymers with formate or chloroacetate groups instead of acetate. The conversion of the polyvinyl esters is usually conducted by base-catalysed transesterification with ethanol:
 [CH2CH(OAc)]n + C2H5OH → [CH2CH(OH)]n + C2H5OAc

The properties of the polymer are affected by the degree of transesterification.

Worldwide consumption of polyvinyl alcohol was over one million metric tons in 2006. Large producers include Kuraray and Sekisui Specialty Chemicals, while mainland China has installed a number of very large production facilities in the past decade and currently accounts for 45% of world capacity.

Structure and properties
PVA is an atactic material that exhibits crystallinity. In terms of microstructure, it is composed mainly of 1,3-diol linkages [−CH2−CH(OH)−CH2−CH(OH)−], but a few percent of 1,2-diols [−CH2−CH(OH)−CH(OH)−CH2−] occur, depending on the conditions for the polymerization of the vinyl ester precursor.

Polyvinyl alcohol has excellent film-forming, emulsifying and adhesive properties. It is also resistant to oil, grease and solvents. It has high tensile strength and flexibility, as well as high oxygen and aroma barrier properties. However, these properties are dependent on humidity: water absorbed at higher humidity levels acts as a plasticiser, which reduces the polymer's tensile strength, but increases its elongation and tear strength.

Safety and environmental considerations
PVA is widely used, thus its toxicity and biodegradation are of interest. Solutions containing more than 5% PVA are toxic to fish. It biodegrades slowly.

See also 
 Vinyl acetate
 Polyvinyl nitrate

References

External links 
MSDS
"Slime" recipe
Forming PVA layers in PET bottles

Vinyl polymers
Biodegradable plastics
Polymers
E-number additives